Kiunjuri Festus Mwangi (born January 18, 1968) is a Kenyan politician. He was born in Kenju, Murang'a County. He has held various political and government positions.

Political life 
Mwangi Kiunjuri graduated from Moi University with a Bachelor of Education (Arts) degree in 1994. He was elected to the parliament in 1997, then representing the Democratic Party. He retained his seat in the 2002 elections. As a member of the Party of National Unity, he was elected to represent Laikipia East Constituency in the 2007 Kenyan parliamentary election. He left office in 2013. 

Kiunjuri has also served in the Kenyan cabinet in various capacities. He became the cabinet secretary for Devolution and Planning in 2015, replacing Anne Waiguru after she resigned on corruption grounds. Following the Jubilee government retaining power in the 2017 general elections, President Uhuru Kenyatta appointed Kiunjuri to be the Cabinet Secretary for Agriculture in 2018. He was relieved of this position on 14 January 2020. Later that year, he founded The Service Party. In the 2022 Kenyan general election, he returned as MP for Laikipia East Constituency.

References

1969 births
Living people
Party of National Unity (Kenya) politicians
Members of the National Assembly (Kenya)
Democratic Party (Kenya) politicians
Moi University alumni
Members of the 8th Parliament of Kenya
Members of the 9th Parliament of Kenya
Members of the 10th Parliament of Kenya
Members of the 13th Parliament of Kenya
Kenyan political party founders